{{Taxobox
| name = Bathyporania ascendens
| image = Bathyporania ascendens Abactinal.jpg
| image_caption =
| regnum = Animalia
| phylum = Echinodermata
| classis = Asteroidea
| ordo = Valvatida
| familia = Poraniidae
| genus = Bathyporania
| genus_authority = Mah & Foltz, 2014 
| species = B. ascendens
| binomial = Bathyporania ascendens}}Bathyporania ascendens is a species of starfish in the family Poraniidae, and the only species of the genus Bathyporania. It is native to the Pacific Ocean and is found in deep water off the coast of North America (it was discovered at Davidson Seamount).

DescriptionBathyporania ascendens has a classical starfish shape with five short arms, a somewhat inflated body and is of pale color. The oral surface is covered with spinelets, and marked by 5 large ambulacral grooves with strong podia.

Biology
The Poraniidae are supposed to be passive deposit-feeders, but as Bathyporania ascendens has been observec climbing on black coral, it may be a predator of deep-sea cnidarians.

DistributionBathyporania ascendens'' has been found during a deep-sea survey by the Monterey Bay Aquarium Research Institute at Davidson Seamount, off the coast of the Monterey region, at 2669 meters deep. Even if this was the only recorded observation to date, this species may have a large distribution, as it is often the case with deep-sea species.

References

Poraniidae
Animals described in 2014